Tammann Peaks are peaks on Pernik Peninsula, Loubet Coast in Graham Land, standing 4 nautical miles (7 km) southeast of Orford Cliff, a like distance east of Lallemand Fjord and 5 km east of Klepalo Hill. Mapped from air photos taken by Falkland Islands and Dependencies Aerial Survey Expedition (FIDASE) (1956–57). Named by United Kingdom Antarctic Place-Names Committee (UK-APC) for Gustav H.J.A. Tammann, German physical chemist who (1900–1935) made important studies of the physical properties of ice.

References
 Tammann Peaks. SCAR Composite Gazetteer of Antarctica

Mountains of Graham Land
Loubet Coast